Timothy Horton Ball (February 16, 1826 – November 8, 1913) was an American historian. He is known for writing The Creek War of 1813 and 1814. The book is a well-known source for Choctaw and Creek Indian history.

Personal life

Ball was born on February 16, 1826, in Massachusetts. He was a historian, missionary, and teacher. Ball came from a wealthy New England family and was able to receive a baccalaureate and master's degree from Franklin College. He later earned a divinity degree from Newton Theological Institution in 1863.

Ball was a prolific writer. As a historian, he made intricate notes with former settlers. Many of his books are hundreds of pages in length. His works can be found in the Library of Congress.

Ball died on November 8, 1913, at Sheffield, Alabama. He was buried in Clarke County, Alabama.

Works

 1895. The Creek War of 1813 and 1814. Chicago, Illinois: Donohue & Henneberry; Montgomery, Alabama: White, Woodruff, & Fowler. Co-written with Henry S. Halbert.

See also
 William Bartram
 Cyrus Byington
 Horatio B. Cushman
 Angie Debo
 Henry S. Halbert
 Gideon Lincecum
 John R. Swanton

References

External links
 
 Lowell Public Library's Timothy H. Ball Website

Historians of Native Americans
1826 births
1913 deaths
Writers from Massachusetts
Historians from Massachusetts